Muhammad Sardar (born 2 March 1944) is a Pakistani wrestler. He competed in the men's freestyle 57 kg at the 1968 Summer Olympics.

References

1944 births
Living people
Pakistani male sport wrestlers
Olympic wrestlers of Pakistan
Wrestlers at the 1968 Summer Olympics
Sportspeople from Lahore
Asian Games medalists in wrestling
Wrestlers at the 1970 Asian Games
Asian Games bronze medalists for Pakistan
Medalists at the 1970 Asian Games
Commonwealth Games medallists in wrestling
Commonwealth Games gold medallists for Pakistan
Wrestlers at the 1970 British Commonwealth Games
20th-century Pakistani people
Medallists at the 1970 British Commonwealth Games